Akhaldaba is a daba in Borjomi Municipality in the Samtskhe–Javakheti region of Georgia. The daba has a population of 1,800, as of 2020.

Akhaldaba Tower is located in the village.

References 

Populated places in Borjomi Municipality